George Maina (12 July 1974 – 15 September 2002) was a Kenyan boxer. He competed in the men's lightweight event at the 1996 Summer Olympics.

References

External links
 

1974 births
2002 deaths
Kenyan male boxers
Olympic boxers of Kenya
Boxers at the 1996 Summer Olympics
Place of birth missing
Lightweight boxers